Virginia House Bill 1414 is proposed legislation introduced into the Virginia General Assembly on January 14, 2015 by Bob Marshall. The bill didn't pass.  The bill would have enabled refusal of service to persons based on "same-sex "marriage" or homosexual behavior" by any public or private business in some way licensed by the state.  Critics suggest that the law, if enacted, could be used by hospitals to turn away patients, restaurants to refuse to serve and to remove students from school and compared it to Jim Crow laws.  The Virginia Christian Alliance emphasized their position that the bill is critical to clergy and that they "fear for their job" should the bill fail.

Similar bills have been introduced but not signed into law in other states.  In 2014, Arizona, Governor Jan Brewer, a Republican, vetoed Arizona SB 1062 which would have given business owners the right to refuse service to homosexuals on religious grounds.  Kansas House Bill 2453 was approved by that state's house of representatives but failed to make it out of the Kansas Senate Judiciary Committee.

See also
 Kansas House Bill 2453

References

External links
 text of Va HB1414

Virginia General Assembly
Same-sex marriage in the United States
2015 in Virginia
Discrimination against LGBT people in the United States
LGBT in Virginia